The 2026 AFC Women's Asian Cup will be the 21st edition of the AFC Women's Asian Cup, the quadrennial international football tournament in Asia competed by the women's national teams in the Asian Football Confederation (AFC).

The final tournament will serve as the final stage of Asian qualification for the 2027 FIFA Women's World Cup.

China are the defending champions.

Host selection

The following four football associations submitted their interest to host the tournament by the 31 July 2022 deadline. The host country will be announced in 2023.

Confirmed bid
 Saudi Arabia – On 31 July, Saudi Arabia submitted its bid in hosting the tournament. The move came as a surprise, with its women's team having only played two first ever friendlies in February the same year after its inception in 2021. Saudi Arabia has never hosted any major women's football tournament, although it has hosted the men's FIFA Confederations Cup from 1992 to 1997. On 2 December, the Saudi delegation submitted its bid to host the 2026 edition.

Expressed interests
 Australia – Australia submitted its interest in hosting the tournament also on 31 July. The country has previously hosted the 2006 AFC Women's Asian Cup, where they finished runners-up. Australia will also host the 2023 FIFA Women's World Cup alongside New Zealand, which is the first FIFA Women's World Cup to be hosted by two nations. The country also hosted the Men's 2015 AFC Asian Cup.

 Jordan – Jordan has previously hosted the 2018 AFC Women's Asian Cup, where they finished bottom of the group stage. Jordan also hosted the 2016 FIFA U-17 Women's World Cup, the first in an Arab country.

 Uzbekistan – The Central Asian nation submitted its interest on that same day. The country has never hosted a major women's football tournament, though it has played in the women's Asian Cup five times. The country has hosted various men's youth competitions, such as the 2008 and 2010 AFC U-16 Championships, the 2022 AFC U-23 Asian Cup and the upcoming 2023 AFC U-20 Asian Cup.

References

External links
, the-AFC.com

2026
Women's Asian Cup
2020s in Asian women's sport
2026 in women's association football